Blues Alley Jazz is a 1980 live album by the pianist George Shearing, accompanied by the double bassist Brian Torff.

Track listing 
 "One for the Woofer" (Billy Taylor) – 8:04
 "Autumn in New York" (Vernon Duke) – 4:42
 "The Masquerade Is Over" (Herb Magidson, Allie Wrubel) – 6:18
 "That's What She Says" (Manfredo Fest) – 3:45
 "Soon It's Gonna Rain" (Tom Jones, Harvey Schmidt) – 4:34
 "High and Inside" (Brian Torff) – 3:28
 "For Every Man There's a Woman" (Harold Arlen, Leo Robin) – 3:41
 "This Couldn't Be the Real Thing" (Gerry Mulligan, Mel Tormé) – 3:17
 "(Up A) Lazy River" (Sidney Arodin, Hoagy Carmichael) – 4:59

Personnel

Performance 
 George Shearing – piano
 Brian Torff - double bass

References 

1980 live albums
George Shearing live albums
Albums produced by Carl Jefferson
Concord Records live albums